Foto Andoni (born 7 January 1946) is an Albanian footballer. He played in two matches for the Albania national football team from 1965 to 1967.

References

1946 births
Living people
Albanian footballers
Albania international footballers
Place of birth missing (living people)
Association football forwards
FK Partizani Tirana players